Llamellín is a town in central Peru, capital of the province Antonio Raimondi in the region Ancash.

References

Populated places in the Ancash Region